Amina Chahinez Hemour (born 4 August 1983) is an Algerian former footballer who played as a forward. She has been a member of the Algeria women's national team.

Club career
Hemour has played for ASE Alger Centre in Algeria.

International career
Hemour capped for Algeria at senior level during two Africa Women Cup of Nations editions (2006 and 2018).

References

External links

1983 births
Living people
People from Bab El Oued
Footballers from Algiers
Algerian women's footballers
Algeria women's international footballers
Women's association football forwards
21st-century Algerian people